Seyyed Hossein Hosseini is an Iranian football defender who last played for Ararat in Armenian Premier League.

Career
Hosseini joined Paykan in Summer 2011.

Club career statistics

References

,

Iranian footballers
Association football defenders
Saipa F.C. players
Paykan F.C. players
Iranian expatriate footballers
1988 births
Living people